This is a list of Wikipedia articles on notable violinist/composers. This is a person prominent as both a violinist and a composer.  For example: Jean Sibelius is not considered a violinist/composer, despite the fact that he played the violin, and neither is Jascha Heifetz, even though he wrote several cadenzas and transcribed showpieces.

Famed violinist/composers

A
 Jean-Baptiste Accolay

B
 Grażyna Bacewicz
 Johann Sebastian Bach
 Charles Auguste de Bériot
 Joseph von Blumenthal
 Joseph Boulogne, Chevalier de Saint-Georges
 Max Bruch
 Bjarne Brustad

C
 Roberto Carnevale
 Arcangelo Corelli

D
 Alfredo D'Ambrosio
 Charles Dancla
 Jakob Dont
 František Drdla
 Antonín Dvořák

E
 George Enescu
 André-Joseph Exaudet

F
 Salina Fisher

G
 Pierre Gaviniès
 Manoj George
 Edvard Greig

H
 Edward W. Hardy
 Jenő Hubay

J
 Joseph Joachim
 Jose Julian Jiménez

K
 Fritz Kreisler
 Rodolphe Kreutzer
 William Kroll
 Jan Kubelík
 Ferdinand Küchler

L
 Pietro Locatelli

M
 Amanda Röntgen-Maier
 Martin Pierre Marsick
 Henri Marteau
 Jacques-Fereol Mazas
 Emil Młynarski
 Vittorio Monti
 Wolfgang Amadeus Mozart

N
 Abhijith P. S. Nair

O
 František Ondříček

P
 Niccolò Paganini

R
 Florizel von Reuter
 Pierre Rode
 Amadeo Roldán

S
 Dilshad Said
 Pablo de Sarasate
 Otakar Ševčík
Maddalena Laura Sirmen
 Louis Spohr
 Johann Strauss II
 Richard Strauss
 Joseph Suk
 Dinesh Subasinghe

T
 Giuseppe Tartini

V
 Flausino Vale
 Franz von Vecsey
 Francesco Maria Veracini
 Henri Vieuxtemps
 Giovanni Battista Viotti 
 Giovanni Battista Vitali
 Antonio Vivaldi

W
 Henryk Wieniawski

Y
 Eugène Ysaÿe

Lists of composers
Composers